Maclurolyra is a genus of Neotropical plants in the grass family. The only known species is Maclurolyra tecta, native to Panamá and Colombia. The genus is named in honor of Floyd Alonzo McClure.

References

Bambusoideae genera
Grasses of North America
Grasses of South America
Flora of Panama
Flora of Colombia
Monotypic Poaceae genera
Bambusoideae